The 1999 Swisscom Challenge doubles was the doubles event of the sixteenth edition of the Swisscom Challenge; a WTA Tier I tournament and the most prestigious tournament held in Switzerland. Serena and Venus Williams were the defending champions, but neither competed this year.

Third seeds Lisa Raymond and Rennae Stubbs won the title, defeating first seeds Nathalie Tauziat and Natasha Zvereva in the final.

Qualifying draw

Main draw

Seeds

Draw

External links
Draw

Zurich Open
Swisscom Challenge